Edward Harold Bell (May 26, 1939 – April 20, 2019) was an American sex offender, murderer and the first fugitive to be featured in the Texan rendition of America's Most Wanted. Following his capture in Panama City, Panama in 1993, he was extradited, convicted and sentenced to a 70-year term for the murder of a Marine in 1978, and later confessed to killing eleven girls during the 1970s. His claims were never conclusively verified, and he died behind bars in 2019, having recanted his previous claims.

Early life and crimes
Edward Harold Bell was born on May 26, 1939, in southern Texas. According to his claims, his father, an oil field worker, frequently moved the family to various towns surrounding the Houston area, and allegedly suffered physical abuse both from him, his scoutmasters at the Boy Scouts and one of his cousins. Bell would also claim in later interviews that his father encouraged him to do violent crime, ranging from robbing banks and raping girls, in addition to encouraging him to kill himself.

In spite of these claims, Bell's life was considered enviable by family and friends alike, as he graduated from the Columbus High School in Columbus and later earned a physical education degree at the Texas A&M University in College Station, where he also played in the university's Aggie Band. After graduation, he found work as a licensed  diver and married his first wife in San Marcos, with the newlyweds then moving to western Texas, where they had three children. After living on a ranch in Terlingua for some time, Bell, who worked as an itinerant pharmaceutical salesman, sold the ranch for an office in downtown Houston.

In 1966, Bell was arrested for exposing himself to a pair of little girls in Sudan, for which he was interned at the Big Spring State Psychiatric Hospital. After spending some time in treatment, he was released, only be rearrested for a similar charge in 1969 after he exposed himself to the 13-year-old daughter of a Lubbock policeman. In order to avoid prosecution, he was interned at the University of Texas Medical Branch for further treatment, where he continued to romance underage patients. By the time of his release, now divorced and forbidden contact with his children, Bell married a 17-year-old female patient and the pair moved a beach house in Galveston. There, he became acquainted with Doug Pruns, a surfer who made custom boards out of his shop based in the area, who allowed him to become a silent partner in the business, despite his reservations about his friend's behavior. Through the mid-to-late 1970s, Bell was repeatedly arrested for flashing and masturbating in front of young girls in Lubbock, Pasadena, Plainview, Bacliff, Houston and Gretna, Louisiana, but was either never charged or the cases were dropped altogether.

Murder of Larry Dickens and escape
On August 24, 1978, while driving his red and white GMC truck around Pasadena, Bell stopped in front of a group of young girls, pulled down his pants and began masturbating in front of them. His actions caught the attention of 26-year-old Larry Dean Dickens, a Marine with a young daughter, who rushed in and got hold of the man's keys in an attempt to prevent him from fleeing. Suddenly, Bell pulled out a pistol and shot Dickens, who staggered into his mother's garage and collapsed onto the floor in front of his horrified mother, who had watched the whole ordeal go by from inside the house. While she was trying to calm Dickens down, Bell grabbed a rifle from his truck, went up to the wounded man and shot him in the forehead before fleeing. He was caught by police shortly afterwards and interned to await trial on a $125,000 bail bond; however, when the trial date came about, Bell did not appear and was thereafter designated as a wanted fugitive.

For the next fourteen years, Bell travelled around various locations in Mexico and Central America using a sailboat, posing as a dead cousin named Cecil Boyd. Throughout this time, he made a living through giving dive trips to American tourists and gold panning. In a 1985 episode of America's Most Wanted, he was named as Texas' most wanted fugitive, bringing further attention to his case and reinvigorating the search for him. After spending time in Costa Rica in 1988 and 1989, Bell moved for a few months in Boquete, Panama, before finally settling in Panama City, where he married for the third time to a young girl from Chepo. At this time, it was reported that he worked at a dock in the port town of Cristóbal.

Arrest, trial and imprisonment
On December 2, 1992, the television show Unsolved Mysteries aired an episode about the murder of Dickens. After the airing of the episode a man recognized Bell as someone he had recently conducted business with in Panama City. On February 14, 1993, a joint operation conducted by the FBI and the Panamanian National Police led to Bell's arrest at a yacht club in Panama City. At his June trial, Bell's attorneys attempted to argue that the killing was done in self-defense, claiming that Dickens was an "unstable" who had threatened to kill him in the name of Jesus. This argument was disproven, and Bell was subsequently convicted and sentenced to 70 years imprisonment. After his sentencing, Bell claimed he had quit being a "flasher" while in Panama, but expressed regret that he had not done earlier so Dickens' life could be spared.

Confessions and suspicions
Bell is considered a suspect in the murders of several young women near Galveston in the 1970s. In 1998, Bell wrote several letters to prosecutors in both Galveston and Harris counties, claiming that he had killed seven teenage girls in their jurisdictions between 1971 and 1977. Despite these gruesome claims, the letters were "kept secret" until 2011, when they were finally revealed by retired Galveston homicide detective Fred Paige to the public in an attempt to uncover any potential leads that could verify Bell's accounts. According to him, some of the case details found in the letters had not been released to the public.

A Houston Chronicle reporter spoke with Bell in July and September of that year. He claimed to the reporter to have actually committed eleven murders, referring to them as the "eleven that went to Heaven." Some detectives asserted that they had long held the conviction that he was a serial killer and had discovered proof to support his allegations. Prosecutors in Galveston, though, declined to show a grand jury his written admissions. They asserted that they could not confirm his confessions. According to reports, Harris County prosecutors never looked into the allegations and misplaced the letters from him. Additionally, he resisted cooperating with the authorities.

Bell claimed that his victims were from Houston, Galveston, Webster, and Dickinson. Five murders occurred in 1971 and six more occurred from about 1974 to 1977. Six of them were murdered in pairs. He named Debbie Ackerman and Maria Johnson, two 15-year-old Galveston "surfing girls" who vanished after hitchhiking, as two of the victims from 1971. He allegedly shot them, then dumped their remains close to a deserted bridge. His confession matched details of the crime scene. They were last seen accepting a ride from a man driving a white van; he happened to own one at that time. Additionally, he made a purchase at a surf shop they frequently frequented. He also invested in a surf shop that they were known to visit. Furthermore, he had a trailer near the bayou where their bodies were found. Another victim from 1971 was thirteen-year-old Colette Wilson, who vanished after leaving a band camp.

Bell referred to another victim as "Pitchford," who was later revealed to be Kimberly Rae Pitchford, 16. After completing a Houston driver's education course, she disappeared. She was discovered in January 1973. He claimed that he was unaware of the other victims' names. However, two victims are believed to be Rhonda Johnson and Sharon Shaw, who vanished from Galveston a few months before Debbie and Maria. Although another man was found guilty of their killings, several investigators now believe that he was innocent. All four of the female victims disappeared near Bell's apartment. 12-year-old Brooks Bracewell and 14-year-old Georgia Geer, who were last seen in 1974 and discovered in 1976, are thought to be the other two victims. He owned a meadow not far from the shop where they had been last seen.

The identity of the remaining three victims are unknown. One, nevertheless, is thought to be Brenda Jones, who went missing in Galveston in 1971. Gloria Gonzales, whose bones were discovered near to Colette's in October 1971, is thought to be another. Suzie Bowers, who disappeared from Galveston in 1977, is thought to be a further victim. Bell further asserted that a "brainwashing programme" had pushed him to kill, rape, and expose himself to young girls. He stated that it began with his father and spread to his three ex-wives, scoutmasters, and a cousin. After making his confessions, he informed a reporter for the Houston Chronicle that he would only offer evidence to support his accusations if he was granted immunity from prosecution. Despite the fact that some thought he was a publicity-seeking "kook," others were certain he was the murderer. After learning of his admissions, some detectives went back and looked at their evidence in those cases. Prosecutors in Galveston reopened Debbie and Maria's cases after learning new information through their investigation, and Bell was identified as the "primary suspect." However, in neither theirs nor any other case were any charges ever brought against him. There was no tangible proof linking him to the other crimes. He asserted that he had made up his admissions in order to receive the death penalty when he was interviewed for the documentary The Eleven in 2017.

His revelations was met with mixed feelings by some of the victims' family members, who were left unsure whether the killer was being genuine or was just using a ploy, due to his requirement that he be given legal immunity in exchange for a full confession. On the other hand, other family members and some investigators considered the claims to be credible, as Bell's criminal past, proximity to the crime scenes at the right dates and mentioning details not known to the public made him a viable suspect in their eyes. In addition to this, Panamanian authorities announced that they considered him a suspect in four rape-murders committed in their country: two while he was residing in Boquete, and another two in Panama City.

Death
Despite several investigations into his claims, Bell was never charged with any other murder besides Dickens'. On April 20, 2019, he died from heart failure at the Wallace Pack Unit, aged 79. His death was met with relief from both Dickens' and the other victims' family members, who believed that he was responsible for their deaths.

See also
 Texas Killing Fields

External links
 Bell v. State (1994)
 The Eleven on IMDb

In the media
 Bell's feature in a 1992 episode of Unsolved Mysteries led to his eventual arrest a year later. In 2017, a television documentary titled The Eleven was produced to examine his alleged confession to the murders of the eleven girls found in the Killing Fields.

References

1939 births
2019 deaths
20th-century American criminals
American male criminals
American people convicted of murder
American people who died in prison custody
Criminals from Texas
Fugitives wanted by the United States
Fugitives wanted on murder charges
People convicted of murder by Texas
Prisoners who died in Texas detention
Suspected serial killers